Audrey Mullender FAcSS FRSA is a British academic who was Principal of Ruskin College, Oxford, from April 2004 to November 2013.

Education 
Mullender was educated at the University of Sheffield, as well as the University of Bordeaux, University of Nottingham, and the University of Warwick, where she obtained a PhD and a DLitt.

Career 
From 1996 to 2004, she was Professor of Social Work and chair of the School of Health and Social Studies and the Faculty of Social Studies and director of the Centre for the Study of Safety and Well-being at the University of Warwick.

She is a prolific writer, with more than 120 publications in the social work field, including 20 books. She is a member of the Academy of Social Sciences, a Fellow of the Royal Society of Arts, and was Vice-Chair of the Social Policy and Social Work Sub-Panel in the last Research Assessment Exercise.

Mullender has carried out research on domestic violence, post-adoption issues, and group work theory.

While Principal of Ruskin College, Mullender took the controversial decision to destroy parts of the college's archives. While she took significant criticism for her decision, Mullender asserted that the College was legally required to dispose of the records because they contained personally identifying information.

Publications

Books

Journal articles

References 

Living people
Academics of Ruskin College
Academics of the University of Warwick
British educational theorists
Alumni of the University of Sheffield
Alumni of the University of Nottingham
Alumni of the University of Warwick
Fellows of the Academy of Social Sciences
Year of birth missing (living people)